Lebanon national basketball team can refer to:

 Lebanon men's national basketball team
 Lebanon men's national under-19 basketball team
 Lebanon men's national under-17 basketball team
 Lebanon women's national basketball team
 Lebanon women's national under-17 basketball team

See also
 Lebanon national team